Xena is a genus of flies in the family Chloropidae.

Species
Xena straminea Nartshuk, 1964

References

Europe

Chloropidae genera
Muscomorph flies of Europe